With the adoption of the Singapore strategy in the 1920s as a key cornerstone of Imperial Defence, Singapore and Malaya became the major British bases in the East, not only to defend British possessions in Asia, but also the Dominions of Australia and New Zealand, who also contributed a large portion of the construction costs.

Up to the 1920s Malaya and Singapore were seen as benign areas, and as such only a small Ordnance Depot was located on the small Island of Palau Brani in Singapore Harbour. By 1937 a New Base Ordnance Depot and Workshops had been completed in Alexandra, Singapore. In the early 1940s tensions with Japan were rising, so a steady but insufficient reinforcement of Malaya command was undertaken, and by the start of hostilities in December 1941 many units of the Royal Army Ordnance Corps (RAOC), Indian Army Ordnance Corps (IAOC) and Australian Army Ordnance Corps (RAAOC) had been dispatched to the region.

Singapore would capitulate in February 1942 in what was to be the largest loss of manpower, resources and stature in the Empire's history and it would not be until late 1945 the British forces returned. Post war, Britain and other Commonwealth nations retained military forces in the region to fight the communist insurgency, deal with the confrontation with Indonesia and nurture the independence of Malaysia and Singapore until 1989 when the New Zealand forces departed Singapore.

From the beginning of the commitment to the defence of Malaya and Singapore, the RAOC, IAOC, AAOC and the Royal New Zealand Army Ordnance Corps (RNZAOC) were working behind the scenes keeping the forces supplied, and during the 1950s and 60s working with and handing over their responsibility and facilities to their Singaporean and Malaysian counterparts as their nations became self-sufficient.

Malaya Command 1939 
Headquarters Malaya Command
Assistant Director of Ordnance Services - Lieutenant Colonel G.C Evelegh,  RAOC (also O.C RAOC)
Chief Ordnance Mechanical  Engineer - Lieutenant Colonel J.P McLare,  M.Sc., M.I.E.E., RAOC
Resident Ordnance Unit 
14 Section RAOC
Ordnance Officers and Warrant Officers
Ordnance Officers, 3rd Class
Major C.H.E Lowther, MC
Ordnance Executive Officers, 2nd  Class 
Captain F.C White
Captain J.J  Scully
Ordnance Officers, 4th Class.
Captain  C.H McVIttle
Captain R.H Finney
Ordnance  Mechanical Engineers 4th Class
Lieutenant D Carmichael, M.Sc.(Eng.),.A.M.I.Mech.E.   
Lieutenant  H Ortliger
Lieutenant W.J Whately,   A.M.Inst.C.E
Ordnance Executive Officers, 3rd  Class 
Lieutenant H.J Bale
Armament Branch- Assistant Ordnance Mechanical Engineers
Lieutenant H.J Howland
Warrant Officers
Sub-Conductor J.F Ardell
Sub-Conductor E.A.J Mackenzie
Sub-Conductor W.E Gale
Armaments Articifer Section (Fitters) Section
Serjant Major W.C Bliss
Armaments Articifer Section (Instrument) Section
Serjant Major B Ashworth

Malaya Command 1940–1942 
Headquarters Malaya Command
DDOS Malaya – Brigadier G.C Evelegh
DDOS LofC – Colonel C.Hunt, RAOC
12 Indian Brigade
 3 Mobile Workshop, IAOC
 25 Mobile Workshop, IAOC
 28 Mobile Workshop, IAOC
 36 Mobile Workshop, IAOC
Indian III Corps
ADOS – Colonel W. P. B. Ashton
DDOS – Colonel (Acting) William Walter LINNEY, IAOC.  May 1941 – February 1942 (Escaped)
DDOS (Mechanical Engineering) – Colonel (Acting) Robert Langdon ROPER, A.M.I.Mech.E. April 1941 – 15 February 1942 (Prisoner of War)
9 Indian Division
 8 Mobile Workshops, IAOC
 9 Mobile Workshops, IAOC
 10 Mobile Workshops, IAOC
 11 Indian Division
 30 Mobile Workshop IAOC
 46 Mobile Workshop IAOC
 47 Mobile Workshop IAOC
 48 Mobile Workshop IAOC
 "Z" Advanced Ordnance Workshop, RAOC (ZAOD) (1941–1942)  at Maxwell Road 
 Advanced Base Ordnance Depot, Kent Halt
 Advanced Base Ordnance Workshop
 Advanced Ordnance Depot Kuala Lumpur
 Advanced Ordnance Depot Penang 
 Advanced Ordnance Depot Valdor
 Advanced Ammunition Depot Kuala Lumpur
 Advanced Ammunition Depot Penang and
 Advanced Ammunition Depot  Valdor
Singapore Fortress
ADOS – LTCOL C. H.McVittie, RAOC
Base Ordnance Depot, Alexandra 
Base Ordnance Workshop, Alexandra (1937–1942)
Base Ammunition Depot,  Alexandra
Base Ammunition Depot,  Kranji
Base Ammunition Depot,  Changi
Base Ammunition Depot,  Nee Soon area
Base Ammunition Depot,  Bukit Timah rifle range (under command of CAPT D. Lawson AAOC)
Base Ammunition Depot,  Nee Soon area
Australian 8th Division
DADOS – LTCOL L.R.D. Stahle 
8 Division Mobile Bath Unit, 
8 Division Salvage Unit, 
2/3 Ordnance Stores Coy -OC – MAJ G. McKay
2/10 Ordnance Field Park – OC – CAPT S.S. Woods  
2/10 Field Park Workshop – OC – MAJ H. Jarvis  
22 Infantry Brigade Workshop – OC – CAPT S. Hawkees
22 Infantry Brigade Ordnance Field Park – OC – CAPT A.T.J. Owen
27 Infantry Brigade Workshop – OC – CAPT Moore
27 Infantry Brigade Ordnance Field Park – OC – CAPT C.F. Young
8 Light Aid Detachments 
69 Light Aid Detachment
73 Light Aid Detachment
74 Light Aid Detachment
84 Light Aid Detachment
85 Light Aid Detachment
86 Light Aid Detachment
87 Light Aid Detachment
88 Light Aid Detachment 
8 Division Mobile Laundry and forward decontamination Unit – OC – CAPT A.A. Smith, Klaung then  Farrar Road, Singapore
Ammunition Instruction and Inspection Staff (OC – CAPT D. Lawson). 
Ordnance Infantry Battalion (Jan–Feb 1942)
A Company, AAOC Personnel
B Company, AAOC Personnel
C Company, AAOC Personnel
D Company, RAOC Personnel
E Company, Personnel from 8 Div Sigs and AASC
British 18th Infantry Division
ADOS – LTCOL A.T. Hingston
4th Ordnance Stores Company (400 men formed at Deepcut, UK December 1941)
18 Division Ordnance Field Park
18 Division Ordnance Workshops

Malaya/Malaysia 1945–1972

 Ordnance Depots
 221 (Indian) Base Ordnance Depot, Alexandra, Singapore 1945–1946
 223 (Indian) Base Ordnance Depot, Alexandra, Singapore 1945–1946
 223 Base Ordnance Depot, Alexandra, Singapore 1946–1949
 3 Base Ordnance Depot, Alexandria, Singapore 1949–1971
 HQ,  3 Sub-depot and RSG in Alexandria
 1 Sub-depot Kranji
 2 Sub-depot (Clothing & General Stores) in Keat Hong
 4 Supply Depot, Dover Road formed from remnants of 4 SPRD	Mid 1968
 30 Battalion, Alexandra, Singapore (Admin by 3BOD) 1949-19?
 31 Battalion, Keat Hong, Singapore 1949–1954? absorbed by 30 Battalion
Ordnance Depot, Kuala Lumpur Malaya 1945-1947
 7 Forward Ordnance Depot, Kuala Lumpur Malaya 1949–1957
5 Advanced Ordnance Depot: 5 Advanced Ordnance Depot (5 AOD) was a short lived RAAOC and RNZAOC combined Depot in Singapore 1970 to 1971.
 Ordnance Services Singapore RAOC residual unit withdrawn in 1975
 Ammunition Depots
 443 Base Ammunition Depot, Kranji Singapore 1945–1969
Ammo Sub Depot, Blakang Mati island (now Sentosa) 1948–1965 
 3 BOD Ammo Sub Depot 1969–1971 formed when 443 BAD closed
 Attap Valley Ammunition Depot Formally the Armament Depot of the British Naval Base, the majority of the depot was handed back to the Singapore Government in 1972 by the RAOC, but several Explosive Storehouses (ESH) were retained as the ammunition depot of the RNZAOC NZAOD until 1989.
 Vehicle Depots
  221 Vehicle Company 1945–195?9 King George then Park Jurong Road, Singapore, renamed to 221 Base Vehicle Depot
  221 Base Vehicle Depot, Tebrau, Johore Bahru, Malaya, 195?- 1969
 Sub depot at Kranji with Centurion tanks
  3 BOD Vehicle Sub Depot 1969–1971, formed when 221 BVD closed
 Ordnance Field Parks
28th Commonwealth Brigade Ordnance Field Park (28 OFP) 1955–1970) Taiping and Ternadak 28 OFP was a RAOC and RAAOC unit capable of fully mobile operations and level of support required for brigade operations. Most of the vehicles Binned vehicles and wagons, fully equipped and stocked with spares to support the brigade in the field. Stores replenishment was achieved through sustainment runs to 3 BOD Singapore.
 35 Independent Infantry Brigade Ordinance Field Park, Kuala Lumper, Kluang and Muar, Malaya, May 1955 -19?
 48 Gurkha Inf Bde Ordnance Field Park, Withdrawn from Malaya, 25 Aug 1950 reinforced with vols from Singapore and renamed 27 Inf Bde OFP
 63 Brigade Ordnance Field Park, Kluang, Malaya C1957
 3 Commando Brigade Ordnance Field Park, Singapore, Borneo, Singapore Jan 1964 –1974
19 (Airportable) Ordnance Field Park, Singapore/Borneo,  Feb 65 – Jan 66 
 97 Ordnance Maintenance Park	Formed at Labuan, Borneo early 1965 by renaming OFP Labuan, Feb 67 relocated to Singapore
 98 Ordnance Maintenance Park	Formed at Kuching, Borneo Oct 1964 by renaming 98 OFP, moved to Singapore Dec 1966, disbanded Jan 1967
 99 Brigade Ordnance Field Park,	.
 Formed in Singapore Dec 1962, moved to Labaun		.
 Renamed OFP Labuan Sept 1963	.
 Supply Depots
 1 Supply Depot (Transferred from RASC)  Terendak Camp, Malacca, Malaya  1965-19?
 2 Supply Depot (Transferred from RASC) Taiping then Kluang, Malaya	1965-19?
 3 Supply Depot (Transferred from RASC) Ipho then Malacca, Malaya 1965-19?
 4 Supply and Petroleum Reserve Depot (4 SPRD) (Transferred from RASC) Dover Road, Singapore 1965–1968,Navy took over distribution of bulk food and all stocks from 4 SPRD transferred to the Naval Base. The rest of the depot became part of 3 BOD
 50 Supply Depot (Transferred from RASC) Labuan, Borneo 1965-19?
 55 Supply Depot, Sembawang Naval basin, became ANZUK Supply Depot in 1972	
 62 Supply Depot (Transferred from RASC) Malaya 1965-19?	
 70 or 71 Supply Depot (Transferred from RASC) Kuching, Borneo 1965-19?
 6 Boat Stores Depot (Transferred from RASC) Singapore, 1965-19?
 Other Ordnance units 
 21 Air Maintenance Platoon, Kuala Lumpur Malaya 1949–1957
 FSTS ==Forward Stores Transit Section in Tawau
 Combat Supplies Platoon, 3 Squadron, RCT, Terandak Camp, Malaysia. 1965–1969

ANZUK Force 1971–1974
ANZUK Ordnance Depot ANZUK Ordnance Depot was the Ordnance component, manned by service personnel from the RAOC, RAAOC and RNZAOC with locally employed civilians (LEC) performing the basic clerical, warehousing and driving tasks. It was part of the ANZUK Support Group supporting the short lived ANZUK Force in Singapore from August 1971 to September 1974. ANZUK Ordnance Depot was formed from the Australian/NZ  5 AOD and UK 3BOD and consisted of:
Stores Sub Depot
Vehicle Sub Depot
Ammunition Sub Depot
Barrack Services Unit
ANZUK Supply Depot, Note: Although an Army Service Corps unit, RAOC personnel were employed in it.

New Zealand Forces South East Asia 1974–1989
New Zealand Advanced Ordnance Depot
From 1974 to 1989 the RNZAOC maintained the New Zealand Advanced Ordnance Depot (NZAOD) in Singapore as part of New Zealand Force South East Asia (NZFORSEA).
RNZAOC Stores Section, NZ Force Workshops 
RNZAOC Stores Section, 1RNZIR, Light Aid Detachment.

See also
Royal Army Ordnance Corps
Royal Australian Army Ordnance Corps
Royal New Zealand Army Ordnance Corps

References

External links
 35 Independent Infantry Brigade Ordnance Field Park
 To the Warrior his Arms A History of the RNZAOC and its predecessors
 "Z" Advanced Ordnance Workshop Malaya 1942

Sources
Bolton, J. S., A History of The Royal New Zealand Army Ordnance Corps (Trentham: The Corps, 1992)
Ferneyhough, Brigadier A.H, A Short History of the RAOC (1965)
Steer, Brigadier Frank, To the Warrior his Arms: The Story of the RAOC 1918–1994 (Pen & Sword, 2005)
Tilbrook, Major John. To The Warrior His Arms: A History of the RAAOC (Royal Australian Army Ordnance Corps Committee, 1989)

Ordnance (stores) units and formations
Army units and formations of British India
Army units and formations of India